Matthew Paul Booth (born 14 March 1977) is a South African former professional footballer who played as a centre-back. Booth spent the majority of his career in his home country, but also played in Russia for six years and briefly played in England for three months. Booth is remembered as a fan favourite among South African fans, who chanted "Booooooth" when he touched the ball, while British media outlets dubbed him as White Knight,  as he was the only white player in the South Africa national team in this period.

Early life and youth career
Booth was born in Fish Hoek to Paul and Anthea Booth. His father Paul was an engineer at the Cape Town city council, a semi-professional footballer and administrator for Fish Hoek AFC, while his mother Anthea was a legal secretary. Booth started playing football for Fish Hoek AFC in 1982 at the age of five. In 1993, he played in the Bayhill U19 tournament for Fish Hoek, where he was spotted by Cape Town Spurs coach Richard Gomes, who saw a lanky youngster flying into tackles halfheartedly and towering above the opposition's attackers and invited him to train with the club's youth. In 1994, shortly after he turned 17, he trained with the senior squad, which went on to win the league and the BobSave Super Bowl. At the time, he worked at a sports shop in Woodstock and would travel by train to Parow after work to train with the team at CR Vasco da Gama fields at the time, then travelled back to Fish Hoek after training.

Career

Club
Booth started playing professionally in 1996, alongside experienced players like Shaun Bartlett and Craig Rosslee. Cape Town Spurs and Seven Stars were merged in 1999 to form Ajax Cape Town. He was deemed surplus to requirements at Ajax and wanted to sell him to newly formed Mother City. He fought back, and eventually joined Mamelodi Sundowns, staying for three seasons.

In 2001, Booth moved to England as he was loaned out to First Division side Wimbledon, but he never made an appearance for the first team, and was only used in reserve team matches. He was later quoted as saying that his stint at Wimbledon was "not a happy time because the club was in turmoil over the move to Milton Keynes". In 2002, he moved to Russia to represent both Rostov and later Krylia Sovetov, playing with and against players such as Branislav Ivanović, Vágner Love and Jan Koller.

Booth retired from professional football on 19 June 2014, even though he was given an option to renew his playing contract.

International
Booth made his debut for South Africa on 20 February 1999, against Botswana at the Cosafa Castle Cup. He made thirty-seven appearances for the national side, scoring one goal. Booth missed out on the 2002 FIFA World Cup due to a knee injury, but was a member of the 2010 FIFA World Cup team (that qualified as hosts of the competition), despite remaining an unused substitute for all three group stage matches. He also captained the under-23 side at the 2000 Summer Olympics.

Due to his height, Booth is considered one of the most important players when meeting opponents with tall players.

Personal life
Booth is married to Sonia Bonneventia, a businesswoman and former model. The couple have two children together.

In 2014, Booth saved a woman from being beaten on Cape Town's nightclub strip on Long Street early on a Saturday morning. Booth had been playing for Wits in an Absa Premiership game against Ajax Cape Town, which they lost 1–0, hosted at Cape Town Stadium on the previous Friday night. After using an ATM and walking back to his friends, he saw a man assaulting the woman and rushed to her assistance. The attacker shoved Booth, who toppled onto a store's window ledge which had spikes to prevent people sitting on the ledge. Members of the Central City Improvement District took the attacker away. Booth returned to his hotel where the team doctor attended to his injuries.

Booth owns junior coaching clinics at multiple public schools. He has also done some television work for the South African Broadcasting Corporation as an analyst and some writing for The Sowetan. Booth has also registered to do a BA degree through the University of South Africa.

In early November 2022, Matthew’s wife Sonia Booth exposed him on instagram regarding infidelity.

Career statistics

Club

International

Scores and results list South Africa's goal tally first, score column indicates score after each Booth goal.

Honours
Cape Town Spurs
 Bob Save Super Bowl: 1994

Mamelodi Sundowns
 Premier Soccer League: 1998–99, 1999–2000
 Rothmans Cup: 1999
 Charity Spectacular: 2000
 Bob Save Super Bowl: 1998

Individual
 Ajax Cape Town Player of the Season: 2013

References

External links

1977 births
Living people
People from Fish Hoek
White South African people
South African people of British descent
South African soccer players
Association football defenders
South Africa international soccer players
Olympic soccer players of South Africa
Footballers at the 2000 Summer Olympics
2002 African Cup of Nations players
2009 FIFA Confederations Cup players
2010 FIFA World Cup players
Cape Town Spurs F.C. players
Mamelodi Sundowns F.C. players
Wimbledon F.C. players
Russian Premier League players
FC Rostov players
PFC Krylia Sovetov Samara players
Bidvest Wits F.C. players
South African expatriate soccer players
South African expatriate sportspeople in England
Expatriate footballers in England
South African expatriate sportspeople in Russia
Expatriate footballers in Russia
Soccer players from the Western Cape
University of South Africa alumni